The Heart of Lilian Thorland is a 1924 German silent film directed by Wolfgang Neff and starring Esther Carena, Evi Eva and Hermann Picha.

The film's sets were designed by the art director Franz Schroedter.

Cast
 Esther Carena
 Evi Eva
 Hermann Picha
 Hermann Vallentin
 Oskar Marion
 Heinrich Schroth
 Karl Falkenberg
 Albert Patry
 Kurt Brenkendorf
 Henri Peters-Arnolds
 Charles Lincoln
 Dora Bergner

References

Bibliography
 Alfred Krautz. International directory of cinematographers, set- and costume designers in film, Volume 4. Saur, 1984.

External links

1924 films
Films of the Weimar Republic
German silent feature films
Films directed by Wolfgang Neff
German black-and-white films
1920s German films